The Adidas_1 was a running shoe made by German multinational corporation Adidas, introduced in early 2005. It was the second general consumer sneaker to incorporate a computer (the Adidas 'Micropacer' had been the first in 1984). The shoe was ahead of its time and a brand statement quickly followed by the introduction of an improved generation shortly after the release of the original shoes, which was called Intelligence Level 1.1. The shoe was later discontinued and later followed by the Adidas_1 basketball shoe, introduced in 2006.

Overview 
Requiring three years of development prior to release, the shoe adjusted itself after four strikes stride, using a motor in the middle of the sole. The motor turned a screw, which in turn lengthened or shortens a cable, changing the compression characteristics of the heel pad.

The shoe typically costs $250 in the U.S at launch. The changes were guided by a sensor in the heel, which determined how much the heel was compressed on each stride. The shoe was battery-powered, and lasted for approximately 100 hours of running.

On 25 November 2005, Adidas released a new version of the Adidas 1. There was an increased range of cushioning and a new motor with 153% more torque in the IL 1.1 upgrade.

See also
Hello Tomorrow, television commercial for this shoe

References

Adidas